Jiangsu Yancheng Middle School (江苏省盐城中学) is a secondary school in Yancheng, Jiangsu. It serves grades 7 through 12.

The school is a part of the Yancheng Middle School Education Group.

 Zhang Ruiqing is the president of the school.

History
It was established in 1927 and moved into its current campus in Autumn 2005.

References

External links
 Jiangsu Yancheng Middle School
 Jiangsu Yancheng Middle School 

High schools in Jiangsu
Middle schools in Jiangsu
Yancheng
1927 establishments in China
Educational institutions established in 1927
Junior secondary schools in China